AMC-15 may refer to:

AMC-15 (satellite), a communications satellite that belonged to SES Americom
USS Waxbill (AMc-15), a coastal minesweeper that belonged to the United States Navy